Best of Shaggy: The Boombastic Collection is the fourth compilation album released by Jamaican singer Shaggy. The album was released in the United Kingdom on August 25, 2008. It reached #22 on the UK Albums Chart. The album features material from all eight of Shaggy's previous studio albums, making it his only compilation to include material from post-Hot Shot.

Track listing
 "Boombastic" - 4:07 (From 'Boombastic')
 "Strength of a Woman" - 3:50 (From 'Lucky Day')
 "Angel" (featuring Rayvon) - 3:55 (From 'Hot Shot')
 "Hey Sexy Lady" (featuring Brian and Tony Gold) - 3:21 (From 'Lucky Day')
 "Feel the Rush" (featuring Trix & Flix) - 3:05 (From 'Intoxication')
 "Those Days" (featuring Na'sha) - 3:23 (From 'Intoxication')
 "Don't Ask Her That" (featuring Nicole Scherzinger) - 4:25 (From 'Clothes Drop')
 "It Wasn't Me" (featuring Ricardo 'RikRok' Ducent) - 3:48 (From 'Hot Shot')
 "Hope" (featuring Prince Mydas) - 3:47 (From 'Hot Shot')
 "In the Summertime" (featuring Rayvon) - 3:45 (From 'Boombastic')
 "Luv Me, Luv Me" (featuring Samantha Cole) - 3:33 (From 'Hot Shot')
 "Oh Carolina" - 3:05 (From 'Pure Pleasure')
 "Ready fi di Ride" - 3:35 (From 'Clothes Drop')
 "Church Heathen" - 4:06 (From 'Intoxication')
 "Leave It to Me" (featuring Brian and Tony Gold) - 3:37 (From 'Hot Shot')
 "Would You Be" (featuring Brian Thompson) - 4:16 (From 'Clothes Drop')
 "Wild 2nite" (featuring Olivia) - 3:30 (From 'Clothes Drop')
 "Gone with Angels" - 4:05 (From 'Clothes Drop')
 "Me Julie" - 3:45 (iTunes exclusive bonus track) (from 'Ali G Indahouse - Da Soundtrack')

Certifications

References

Shaggy (musician) albums
2008 greatest hits albums